Wang Liang (born April 1, 1979) is a Chinese football player as a right back or right midfielder.

Club career
Wang Liang started his career with Liaoning F.C. making his debut in 1999. The following season he would establish himself as a regular playing in 17 games. He would eventually play for Liaoning for seven season before transferring to Shandong Luneng Taishan where he had a mixed period, winning the China Super League with them but unable to establish himself as a regular. He would move back to Liaoning after two seasons with Shandong on loan. Liaoning were relegated in the Chinese Super League 2008 season and Wang Liang returned to Shandong.

International career
Wang Liang began his senior international football career on July 28, 2000 in a friendly against South Korea that China lost 1-0. After several friendlies he could not establish himself within the Chinese team and it was not until Zhu Guanghu became the Chinese Head coach did Wang become a consistent member within the team. He would experience some success with the team when he won the 2005 East Asian Football Championship, however when qualification for the 2007 AFC Asian Cup came about Zhu decided to drop Wang for the experienced Sun Jihai and the versatility of Cao Yang.

Honours

Club
Shandong Luneng
Chinese Super League: 2006, 2010
Chinese FA Cup: 2006

Country
East Asian Football Championship: 2005

References

External links
 
 
 Player stats at football-lineups.com

1979 births
Living people
Footballers from Shenyang
China international footballers
Chinese footballers
Liaoning F.C. players
Shandong Taishan F.C. players
Chinese Super League players
Association football defenders
Association football midfielders